The Beatty Saugeen River is a river in the Saugeen River and Lake Huron drainage basins in Grey County, southwestern Ontario, Canada. It is a tributary of the South Saugeen River.

Course
It flows west, to the north of the community of Dromore, then southwest, passing to the north of the community of Yeovil. The river heads west, over Holstein Dam at the community of Holstein, and under Ontario Highway 6 south of the community of Orchardville. The Beatty Saugeen turns northwest, passing to the south of the community of Hampden in the township of West Grey, before reaching its mouth at the South Saugeen River on the south side of the town of Hanover.

Geology
The headwaters of the river are in the Dundalk Till plain, and the remainder of the river in the Horseshoe Moraine and the Teeswater Drumlin field.

Ecology
There are four monitoring stations in the Beatty Saugeen drainage basin: two for Benthic zone animals, one for surface water quality, and one combined. There are two rare species: the Delta-spotted spiketail and the Hart's Tongue Fern.

See also
List of rivers of Ontario

Sources

External links
 Saugeen Valley Conservation Authority

Rivers of Grey County